Gerald Weiß (12 July 1945 – 21 January 2022) was a German politician. A member of the Christian Democratic Union of Germany, he served in the Landtag of Hesse from 1974 to 1987 and again from 1991 to 1998 and served in the Bundestag from 1998 to 2009. He died on 21 January 2022, at the age of 76.

References

1945 births
2022 deaths
Members of the Bundestag 1998–2002
Members of the Bundestag 2002–2005
Members of the Bundestag 2005–2009
Members of the Landtag of Hesse
Members of the Bundestag for Hesse
Christian Democratic Union of Germany politicians
Johannes Gutenberg University Mainz alumni
Officers Crosses of the Order of Merit of the Federal Republic of Germany
People from Rüsselsheim